Just Salad is a chain of fast casual restaurants with a mission to make everyday health and sustainability possible. The brand serves accessible, plant-centric meals with homemade dressings, batch-cooked proteins, from-scratch recipes, and daily-prepped produce. Empowering customers to “Eat with Purpose,” Just Salad is home to the world’s largest restaurant reusable program and the first U.S. restaurant chain to carbon label its menu.

History 
The company was founded in 2006 by childhood friends Nick Kenner and Rob Crespi after noticing a shortage of healthy, accessible food options in Manhattan Nick Kenner is currently the managing partner of Just Salad.

Since opening the first Just Salad location at 320 Park Avenue in New York City in 2006, Kenner has grown the brand to 70 store locations worldwide employing over 1,000 people in New York, New Jersey, Connecticut, Pennsylvania, Illinois, North Carolina, Florida, and Dubai. 

Sustainability 

Empowering customers to eat with purpose, Just Salad is the home of the world’s largest restaurant reusable program, with the iconic reusable bowl. Guests can purchase a bowl for $1 and receive a free topping with every reuse.

In 2020, Just Salad became the first U.S. restaurant chain to carbon label its menu, showcasing the environmental impact of food choices. To make climate-smart decisions even easier, the brand also offers digital customers a “Climatarian” dietary filter showcasing a selection of items with a lower carbon footprint. 

Just Salad continues to expand its repertoire of climate-conscious options. To name a few, the chain offers an entirely vegan smoothie menu and plant-based alternatives like Plant-Based Beyond Chicken® + Violife® Creamy Vegan Feta.

The company weaves sustainability into every consumer touchpoint and has implemented policies aimed at reducing waste in all forms: 

 Food-waste: In-store composting, food donation programs, and selling of surplus food through the Too Good to Go app
 Single-use plastic: Guests are required to opt-in to receive utensils when they order in the Just Salad Mobile App or orderjustsalad.com.
 Packaging: Pickup orders are placed on pickup stations without bags for single-item orders. Guests who order in-store are asked if they’d like to receive a bag, thus making no bag the default option.
 Sandra Noonan, the company’s Chief Sustainability Officer, is a certified TRUE Zero Waste advisor.
Below are notable coverage highlights and awards recognizing Just Salad's sustainability programs and initiatives:

 Adweek: Can Fast Food Survive Without Single-Use Plastics? (10/26/22)
 World Economic Forum: How 4 Companies Are Making Takeout Sustainable (9/12/22)
 Business Insider: How chief sustainability officers are bringing more accountability and less waste to their companies — and the world (7/1/22)
 QSR Magazine: Cover of July 2022 Climate Issue (7/1/22)
 PR Newswire: Upstream and Closed Loop Partners Announce Finalists of The Reusies® 2022, Making Throw Away Go Away (6.15.22)
 Green Queen: The How and Why of Carbon Labelling: Q+A w/ Just Salad’s Chief Sustainability Officer (4/28/22)
 Waste360: Just Salad's Sustainability Report Highlights Waste-Free Dining Movement (4/20/22)
 New York Times: The Rise of the Climatarian (5/20/21)
 Fast Company: World Changing Ideas Awards 2021: Food Finalists and Honorable Mentions (5/4/21)
 Forbes: Making Salads Even Greener: Just Salad Is Bringing Zero-Waste Dining Into The Mainstream (4/6/21)
 Adweek: Just Salad to Become the First Restaurant to Add Carbon Labeling to Its Menu (6/5/20)
 Cheddar: Just Salad's Reusable Bowls Are a Hit For Sustainability Program (2/12/20)

References 

Companies based in New York City
Restaurants in New York City
Restaurant chains in the United States
2006 establishments in New York City
Restaurants established in 2006